Audio-Animatronics (also known as simply Animatronics, and sometimes shortened to AAs) is the registered trademark for a form of robotics animation created by Walt Disney Imagineering for shows and attractions at Disney theme parks, and subsequently expanded on and used by other companies. The robots move and make noise (generally a recorded speech or song), but are usually fixed to whatever supports them. They can sit and stand but usually cannot walk. An Audio-Animatronic is different from an android-type robot in that it uses prerecorded movements and sounds, rather than responding to external stimuli. In 2009, Disney debuted an interactive version of the technology called Autonomatronics, and in 2018, announced aerial stunt figures called Stuntronics.

History

Audio-Animatronics were originally a creation of Walt Disney employee Lee Adams, who worked as an electrician at the Burbank studio and was one of Disney's original Imagineers. Walt Disney got a mechanical toy bird in New Orleans, and he decided to improve the device that moved it. An early robotic figure was the Dancing Man, created by Roger Broggie and Wathel Rogers, and modeled after a tap dancing routine by actor Buddy Ebsen.

The term "Audio-Animatronics" was first used commercially by Disney in 1961, was filed as a trademark in 1964, and was registered in 1967.

The Audio-Animatronic show The Enchanted Tiki Room opened in 1963 at Disneyland. It is a room full of tropical creatures with eye and facial actions synchronized to a musical score entirely by electromechanical means. The Audio-Animatronic cast of the musical revue uses tones recorded on tape to vibrate a metal reed that closes a circuit to trigger a relay, which sends a pulse of electricity to a mechanism that causes a pneumatic valve to move part of the figure.

The movements of the attraction's birds, flowers, and tiki idols are triggered by sound. Figures' movements have a neutral "natural resting position" that the limb or part returns to when there is no electric pulse present. Other than this, the animation is a digital system, with only on/off moves, such as an open or closed eye.

Other early Audio-Animatronics were at the 1964 New York World's Fair. They were used in the Great Moments with Mr. Lincoln exhibit at the State of Illinois Pavilion, Pepsi/UNICEF's "it's a small world" exhibit, General Electric's Carousel of Progress, and Ford Motor Company's "Magic Skyway."

An Audio-Animatronic robin sang a duet with Julie Andrews in the 1964 film Mary Poppins.

Technology

Pneumatic actuators are powerful enough to move heavier objects like simulated limbs, while   hydraulics are used more for large figures. On/off type movement would cause an arm to be lifted (for example) either up over an animatron's head or down next to its body, but with no halting or change of speed in between. To create more realistic movement in large figures, an analog system was used. This gave the figures' body parts a full range of fluid motion, rather than only two positions.

To permit a high degree of freedom, the control cylinders resemble typical miniature pneumatic or hydraulic cylinders, but mount the back of the cylinder on a ball joint and threaded rod. This ball joint permits the cylinders to float freely inside the frame, such as when the wrist joint rotates and flexes.

The oil-filled cylinders occasionally drip or leak, so it is sometimes necessary to do makeup touch-up work, or to strip the clothing off a figure due to leaking fluids inside. The Enchanted Tiki Room remains a pneumatic theatrical set, primarily due to the leakage concerns, as the Audio-Animatronic figures are above the audience's heads.

Because each individual cylinder requires its own control channel, the original Audio-Animatronic figures were relatively simple in design, to reduce the number of channels required. For example, the first human designs (referred to internally by Disney as series A-1) included all four fingers of the hand as one actuator. It could wave its hand but it could not grasp or point at something. With modern digital computers controlling the device, the number of channels is virtually unlimited, allowing more complex, realistic motion. The current versions (series A-100) now have individual actuators for each finger. Disney also introduced a brand new figure that is used in Star Wars: Galaxy's Edge and is referred to as the A1000.

Compliance
Compliance is a new technology that allows faster, more realistic movements without sacrificing control. In the older figures, a fast limb movement would cause the entire figure to shake in an unnatural way. The Imagineers thus had to program slower movements, sacrificing speed in order to gain control. This was frustrating for the animators, who, in many cases, wanted faster movements. Compliance improves this situation by allowing limbs to continue past the points where they are programmed to stop; they then return quickly to the "intended" position, much as real organic body parts do. The various elements also slow to a stop at their various positions, instead of using the immediate stops that caused the unwanted shaking. This absorbs shock, much like the shock absorbers on a car or the natural shock absorption in a living body.

Cosmetics
The skin of an Audio-Animatronic is made from silicone rubber. Because the neck is so much narrower than the rest of the skull, the skull skin cover has a zipper up the back to permit easy removal. The facial appearance is painted onto the rubber, and standard cosmetic makeup is also used. Over time, the flexing causes the paint to loosen and fall off, so occasional makeup work and repainting are required.

Generally as the rubber skin flexes, the stress causes it to dry and begin to crack. Figures that do not have a high degree of motion flexibility, such as the older A-1 series for President Lincoln, may only need to have their skin replaced every ten years. The most recent A-100 series human AAs, like the figure for President Barack Obama, also include flexion actuators that move the cheeks and eyebrows to permit more realistic expressions; however, the skin wears out more quickly and needs replacement at least every five years.

The wig on each human AA is made from natural human hair for the highest degree of realism, although using real hair creates its own problems, since the changing humidity and constant rapid motions of the moving AA carriage hardware throughout the day cause the hair to slowly lose its styling, requiring touch-ups before each day's showing.

Autonomatronics
Autonomatronics is a registered trademark for a more advanced Audio-Animatronic technology, also created by Walt Disney Imagineers.

The original Audio-Animatrons used hydraulics to operate robotic figures to present a pre-programmed show. This more sophisticated technology can include cameras and other sensors feeding signals to a high-speed computer which processes the information and makes choices about what to say and do. In September 2009, Disney debuted "Otto", the first interactive figure that can hear, see and sense actions in the room. Otto can hold conversations and react to the audience.

In December 2009, Great Moments with Mr. Lincoln returned to Disneyland using the new Autonomatronics technology.

Stuntronics

In June 2018, it was revealed that Disney Imagineering had created autonomous, self-correcting aerial stunt robots called stuntronics. This new extension of animatronics utilizes onboard sensors for precision control of advanced robotics to create animatronic human stunt doubles that can perform advanced aerial movements, such as flips and twists.

Variations

The technology of the AAs at Disney's theme parks around the world vary in their sophistication. They range from the blinking and mouth movements at Walt Disney's Enchanted Tiki Room to full body movement, from the mouth to the tip of the fingers at Stitch's Great Escape! at the Magic Kingdom.

Current technologies have paved the way for more elaborate AA figures, such as President Donald Trump in The Hall of Presidents, "Ursula head" inside the Mermaid Lagoon Theater at Tokyo DisneySea, the Indiana Jones figures inside the Indiana Jones attractions at both Disneyland and Tokyo DisneySea, the "swordfighting" pirates inside Pirates of the Caribbean at Disneyland Park (Paris), the "lava/rock monster" inside Journey to the Center of the Earth at Tokyo DisneySea, the "Na'vi Shaman of Songs" inside the Na'vi River Journey, the dinosaurs inside DINOSAUR, and the "Yeti" inside Expedition Everest at Disney's Animal Kingdom (though the latter has been non-functional since 2008, using a strobe light to simulate movement of the still figure), or the Roz figure inside Monsters, Inc. Mike & Sulley to the Rescue! at Disney California Adventure.

The Roz figure is able to "interact" with guests with help from an unseen ride operator who chooses pre-recorded messages for Roz to "speak", thereby seeming to "react" to individual guests' unique appearances and clothing. Mr. Potato Head outside of the Toy Story Mania! attractions at the Disney California Adventure and Disney's Hollywood Studios parks does the same.

One of the newest figures comes with changes to the classic Pirates of the Caribbean attraction at Disneyland and the Magic Kingdom, both now featuring characters from the Pirates of the Caribbean film series. The Jack Sparrow figure is based on the actor that portrays him, Johnny Depp, and features his voice and facial mold. So far, the newest and most advanced Audio-Animatronic figure is Abraham Lincoln at The Disneyland Story: Featuring Great Moments With Mr. Lincoln at Disneyland. Lincoln can move his lips to form words, can make dramatic movements, and can portray emotions to match the words he is saying.

The Audio-Animatronic anglerfish inside The Seas with Nemo & Friends Uses a robotic arm that is connected to a puppet to control realistic swimming movements of the animatronic to make the effect that the anglerfish is actually swimming. Robotic arms has also appeared in other attractions such as The Sum of All Thrills in the Innoventions area at Epcot. 

The Audio-Animatronic Indiana Jones figures inside Indiana Jones Adventure: Temple of the Crystal Skull at Tokyo DisneySea resemble actor Harrison Ford, unlike the original figures found at the Disneyland version, Temple of the Forbidden Eye. In 2010, some of the Audio-Animatronic figures at the Disneyland version were replaced with more technically advanced figures that also look more like Ford.

The Audio-Animatronics formerly featured in the Great Movie Ride used the likeness of the actors that portrayed the characters. Audio-Animatronics found in Seven Dwarfs Mine Train at Magic Kingdom are Disney's latest animatronic technology and use projections as faces to make the dwarfs' mouths move and their eyes blink. The projected face technology is also used in Frozen Ever After at Epcot. These Audio-Animatronics were succeeded by the figures in use in the Star Wars: Galaxy's Edge lands at Disneyland and Disney's Hollywood Studios in 2019, such as Hondo Ohnaka in the Millennium Falcon – Smugglers Run attraction. These new figures, known as A-1000 Animatronics, have a fully functional face, featuring a full range of motion in the eyes and mouth.

In popular culture
 Less-sophisticated forms of audio-animatronics also gained popularity in the 1980s through use at family entertainment centers such as Showbiz Pizza Place and Chuck E. Cheese's. At Showbiz, ''The Rock-afire Explosion'' band was made by Aaron Fechter and Creative Engineering, who also made other animatronic characters and arcade redemption games. They are also used in film and television special effects.
 Several passengers and the crew of a Pioneer Zephyr are represented in a display of this historic train at Chicago's Museum of Science and Industry. Neatly dressed in the proper style of first class passengers of their era, one remarks upon the casual dress of the visitors.
 The George Washington Masonic National Memorial features an animatronic George Washington.
 John Wardley is often said to have brought animatronics to the United Kingdom, utilizing a concept called Ramped Movement, which allowed for smoother movements of the figures. John appeared on Tomorrow's World in the 1970s showing a guitar playing animatronic programmed to music. His first project was the creation of the animated show "50 Glorious Years" for Tussaud's "Royalty and Empire Exhibition" at Windsor.
 Scissor Sisters member Ana Matronic named herself after animatronics, as a homage to her love of The Bionic Woman.
 The Pennsylvania Lottery uses an animatronic groundhog named Gus (who refers to himself as the "second-most-famous groundhog in Pennsylvania", after Punxsutawney Phil) as the mascot for television commercials for their instant scratch-off games.
 The 2015 Disney film Tomorrowland uses the Audio-Animatronics word as a term for their sophisticated android characters.
 A dissociative animatronic Lincoln is one of the malfunctioning robots at the robot asylum in the Futurama episode "Insane in the Mainframe".

Gallery

See also
List of Disney attractions using Audio-Animatronics

References

External links 
 DizTech: The Disney Technology Blog at DizFanatic.com
 How Animatronics Work at HowStuffWorks.com
 Masters of Puppets: Rock-afire Explosion

 
Disney jargon
Disney technology